The Mac Gregor School (Colegio Mac Gregor in Spanish) is a private, bilingual and co-educational school located in Acapulco, Mexico. It was founded in 1951 and is one of Acapulco's highest ranking schools. Its motto is “Forjando a los líderes del mañana” (translated to English as “Forging the leaders of tomorrow”). Desde a principios de pandemia se ah notado una notable decadencia en su educación, haciendo que los alumnos se transferieran a diferentes escuelas, siendo el Mac Gregor una de las escuelas con menor reputación actualmente.

Campuses
The school has two campuses. The first campus is located on Ejido Avenue in the middle part of Acapulco. In 1997, the second campus was built on Hilario Malpica Street in Costa Azul.

School Profile
The Mac Gregor School is divided into three levels: Preescolar (Kindergarten), Primaria (Elementary) and Secundaria (Middle School). The Spanish program has official recognition by the Secretaría de Educación Pública to offer valid Kindergarten, Elementary and Middle School education with the country's educational system. English is taught from the first year of kindergarten and continues throughout elementary and middle school. The middle school students have the option of taking the Preliminary English Test (PET) of the University of Cambridge with the degree of world's certification. The school counts with a computer lab where the students from Kinder 1 to Grade 9 attend.

The school's faculty is composed by highly qualified and motivated teachers who are in constant training.

The Mac Gregor School offers a high academic level, a strong values program and an environmental education.  Students also participate in academic and sports activities.

Awards
In 2005, the Mac Gregor School was recognized with an international award named “Laurel de Oro a la Calidad”. This award is given every year in Mexico and Spain to the most outstanding in different fields of our actual society. They also have other awards on chess, sports, singing and oratorical.

External links
 Colegio Mac Gregor website

Private schools in Mexico